The El Paso–Las Cruces, Texas–New Mexico, combined statistical area consists of two counties in western Texas and one in southern New Mexico.  This CSA was defined as part of the United States Office of Management and Budget's 2013 delineations for metropolitan, micropolitan, and combined statistical areas.  As of the 2020 United States Census, the El Paso-Las Cruces CSA had a population of 1,088,420 making it the 56th largest combined statistical area in the United States. The statistical area consists of the metropolitan areas of El Paso, Texas and Las Cruces, New Mexico. This CSA has a GDP of about $33 billion and would rank 58th nationally among all CSA or metro areas. The total land area of the El Paso–Las Cruces combined statistical area is 9,402 sq. mi.

Counties

Doña Ana County, New Mexico
El Paso County, Texas
Hudspeth County, Texas

Communities

El Paso County
Agua Dulce, Texas
Anthony, Texas (City)
Butterfield, Texas
Canutillo, Texas
Clint, Texas
Fabens, Texas
Fort Bliss, Texas
Homestead Meadows North, Texas
Homestead Meadows South, Texas
El Paso, Texas (Principal city)
Horizon City, Texas (City)
Montana Vista, Texas
Morning Glory, Texas
Newman, Texas
Prado Verde, Texas
San Elizario, Texas (City)
Socorro, Texas (City)
Tornillo, Texas
Vinton, Texas
Westway, Texas

Doña Ana County
Anthony, New Mexico (City)
Chamberino, New Mexico
Chaparral, New Mexico
Doña Ana, New Mexico
Hatch, New Mexico
La Mesa, New Mexico
Las Cruces, New Mexico (Principal city)
Mesilla, New Mexico
Mesquite, New Mexico
Organ, New Mexico
Picacho, Dona Ana County, New Mexico
Radium Springs, New Mexico
Rincon, New Mexico
Salem, New Mexico
Santa Teresa, New Mexico
Sunland Park, New Mexico (City)
University Park, New Mexico
Vado, New Mexico
White Sands, New Mexico

Hudspeth County
Allamoore, Texas
Dell City, Texas
Salt Flat, Texas
Sierra Blanca, Texas (Principal City)

See also
List of metropolitan areas in New Mexico
List of metropolitan areas in Texas

References

Metropolitan areas of New Mexico
Metropolitan areas of Texas
.
.
Doña Ana County, New Mexico
El Paso County, Texas
Hudspeth County, Texas
Combined statistical areas of the United States